War of the Worlds (2017) was a professional wrestling tour co-produced by the American Ring of Honor (ROH) and Japanese New Japan Pro-Wrestling (NJPW) promotions. The tour's four events took place on May 7 at the Ted Reeve Arena in Toronto, Ontario, May 10 at the Ford Community & Performing Arts Center in Dearborn, Michigan, May 12 at the Hammerstein Ballroom in New York City and May 14 at the 2300 Arena in Philadelphia, Pennsylvania. The third night aired live on pay-per-view (PPV), while the fourth night was taped for four future episodes, including the 300th overall episode, of ROH's weekly television program, Ring of Honor Wrestling. 2017 was the fourth year in which ROH and NJPW co-produced events under the War of the Worlds name. During the third night of the tour, NJPW announced the creation of the IWGP United States Heavyweight Championship.

Production

Background
In 2014, Japanese promotion New Japan Pro-Wrestling (NJPW) and Ring of Honor (ROH) formally forged a relationship, which saw them present the first War of the Worlds show on May 17, 2014, at the Hammerstein Ballroom in New York City, New York. The following year, War of the Worlds was held over two days at the 2300 Arena in Philadelphia, Pennsylvania and in 2016 it was expanded to a three-show tour with shows taking place in Dearborn, Michigan, Toronto, Ontario and New York City. The 2017 War of the Worlds tour was officially announced in January 2017, when ROH put tickets on sale for the events. At that point, ROH announced a three-show tour with events taking place on May 7 in Toronto, May 10 in Dearborn and May 14 in Philadelphia with rumors of a fourth show to be added later. The fourth show, taking place on May 12 in New York City, was officially added to the tour in March. It was also announced that the show would air on pay-per-view (PPV) as well as the FITE TV application, PlayStation Network and ROHWrestling.com. In Japan, the show would also air live on NJPW's internet streaming site, NJPW World. These would mark the fourth annual shows co-promoted by NJPW and ROH.

ROH began announcing the NJPW wrestlers for the tour on April 17, starting with IWGP Intercontinental Champion Tetsuya Naito and Kushida. ROH wrestlers announced for the tour included ROH World Champion Christopher Daniels, ROH World Television Champion Marty Scurll, ROH World Six-Man Tag Team Champions Bully Ray and The Briscoes (Jay Briscoe and Mark Briscoe), Dalton Castle and Jay Lethal in addition to ROH World Tag Team Champions The Young Bucks (Matt Jackson and Nick Jackson), Cody and Will Ospreay, who work for both NJPW and ROH. Over the following days, ROH continued announcing additional NJPW wrestlers for the tour, including Hirooki Goto, the Los Ingobernables de Japón trio of Bushi, Evil and Sanada Gedo, and Hiroshi Tanahashi. Also announced was Kenny Omega, who would, however, only work the Toronto show.

Storylines
The War of the Worlds tour featured professional wrestling matches that involved different wrestlers from pre-existing scripted feuds and storylines. Wrestlers portrayed villains, heroes, or less distinguishable characters in the scripted events that built tension and culminated in a wrestling match or series of matches.

On April 14, ROH announced the first match for the tour, which would see Christopher Daniels defend the ROH World Championship against Matt Taven on May 10. Taven earned a title shot by winning the Honor Royale on March 4, announcing shortly thereafter his intention of challenging Daniels on the War of the Worlds tour. Daniels and Taven had a history involving the ROH World Tag Team Championship with Taven and Michael Bennett winning the title from Daniels and Frankie Kazarian in 2015. The Dearborn show would also feature a match for the ROH World Six-Man Tag Team Championship with defending champions, Bully Ray and The Briscoes, defending against NJPW's reigning NEVER Openweight 6-Man Tag Team Champions Los Ingobernables de Japón (Bushi, Evil and Sanada).

The May 12 show would be main evented by the ROH World Championship being contested in a three-way match with Daniels defending against Cody and Jay Lethal. Cody's challenge had been accepted by Daniels prior to the match with Taven, while Lethal earned a spot in the match on April 8 by winning a four-way match, also involving Hangman Page, Jay White and Silas Young. Cody and Lethal had been feuding with each other in the months prior to War of the Worlds with Lethal defeating Cody in a Texas bullrope match at Supercard of Honor XI. Other title matches would include Marty Scurll defending the ROH World Television Championship against Matt Sydal and Bully Ray and The Briscoes defending the ROH World Six-Man Tag Team Championship against the Chaos trio of Beretta, Hirooki Goto and Rocky Romero.

The tour concluding Philadelphia show would be headlined by a Philadelphia Street Fight between Adam Cole and Marty Scurll. Cole's ROH contract had expired on May 1 and it was reported that the Philadelphia show would be his final scheduled appearance for the promotion. ROH set up the storyline behind the match at the New York City show, where the Bullet Club stable turned on Cole and replaced him with Scurll. Earlier in the Philadelphia show, Cole cost Scurll the ROH World Television Championship in his match against Kushida, leading to the main event street fight. Instead of being taped for Ring of Honor Wrestling, the main event was taped to be released later on ROH's official website.

Aftermath
On May 22, 2017, ROH announced a second War of the Worlds tour, entitled War of the Worlds UK, this time taking place in the United Kingdom, for which ROH and NJPW were joined by the Mexican Consejo Mundial de Lucha Libre (CMLL) and the British Revolution Pro Wrestling (RPW) promotions. The three shows take place on August 18 in London, August 19 in Liverpool and August 20 in Edinburgh.

Results

Night 1

Night 2

Night 3

Night 4 (TV Tapings)

See also

Professional wrestling in Canada

References

External links
Official New Japan Pro-Wrestling website 
Official Ring of Honor website

2017 in professional wrestling
2017
Professional wrestling in Toronto
May 2017 events in North America
Professional wrestling in New York City
Professional wrestling in Dearborn, Michigan
Professional wrestling in Philadelphia
Events in Toronto
Events in New York City
Events in Wayne County, Michigan